Old Port is a name used by historic port districts in several jurisdictions. 

Old Port or Oldport may refer to:

Historic port districts
 Oldport of Berlin Charter Township, Michigan, United States
 The Port, Cambridge, Massachusetts, United States; also called the "Old Port", a neighborhood built atop an infilled former port
 Old Port of Genoa, Genoa, Italy
 Old Port of Limassol, Limassol, Cyprus; a historic port district
 Old Port of Marseille. Marseille, France; a historic port district
 Old Port of Montreal, Montreal, Quebec, Canada; a historic port district
 Old Port, Port of Quebec, Quebec City, Quebec, Canada; a historic port district
 Old Port of Portland, Maine, United States; a historic port district
 Puerto Viejo, Cerro Azul, Peru; a historic port district
 The old location of Newport, Tennessee

Other uses
 Old Port Formation, Pennsylvania, United States; a geological rock formation
 Old Port, Port Royal, Pennsylvania, United States; a village formerly called Saint Tammany, that was renamed when the Port Royal post office in Saint Tammany was moved to Perrysville, and the district was renamed to Port Royal

See also

 Old Port of Montreal Corporation
 Any Old Port!, 1932 comedy short film
 Any Old Port in a Storm, 1908 song
 
 Old Post (disambiguation)
 Newport (disambiguation), including "New Port"
 Port (disambiguation)
 Old (disambiguation)